Charles Rann Kennedy (born Derby, England, 14 February 1871; died Los Angeles, California, 16 February 1950) was an Anglo-American dramatist.

Biography
He began life as an office boy, largely educated himself and began lecturing and writing early. He later became an actor, press agent, and theatrical business manager. This led to the production of dramas for the stage with which he combined the writing of short stories, critical articles and poems. He taught for several years at Bennett Junior College in Millbrook, New York. He retired in Los Angeles.

Works
After 1905, he spent most of his time writing drama, including:
 The Servant in the House, his first success (1908)
 The Winter Feast (1908)
 The Terrible Meek (1911)
 The Necessary Evil (1913)
 The Idol-Breaker (1914)
 The Rib of the Man (1916)
 The Army with Banners (1917)
All of these dramas deal with problems of society and are of a serious, reforming tendency.
 World Within: A Cycle of Sonnets (1956) -- posthumously published collection of sonnets

Family
In 1898, he married actress Edith Wynne Matthison. She was an advisor during the development of his dramas, acted in them, and also taught at Bennett Junior College.

Notes

References

External links

1871 births
1950 deaths
English dramatists and playwrights
20th-century American dramatists and playwrights
People from Derby
English emigrants to the United States
American male dramatists and playwrights
English male dramatists and playwrights
20th-century American male writers